Jack Carroll may refer to:
 Jack Carroll (comedian) (born 1998), British comedian
 Jack Carroll (footballer, born 1922) (1922–1999), Australian rules footballer for Collingwood
 Jack Carroll (footballer, born 2002), Australian rules footballer for Carlton
 Jack Carroll (politician) (born 1942), Canadian politician
 Jack Carroll (rugby union) (1925–2018), Australian rugby union player
 Jack Carroll (hurler) (1921–1998), Irish hurler
 John M. Carroll (information scientist), known as Jack, information scientist
 Jack the Bulldog (John S. Carroll), official mascot of the Georgetown University Hoyas
 Jack Carroll (athlete), competed at the 1952 Summer Olympics
 Jack Carroll, author in the anthology Ring of Fire III

See also
 John Carroll (disambiguation)